Beamsville (2021 Urban area estimated population 13,323) is a community that is part of the town of Lincoln, Ontario, Canada. It is located along the southern shore of Lake Ontario and lies within the fruit belt of the Niagara Peninsula. It contains century-old brick buildings, an old-fashioned downtown area with barbershops, women's dress shops, a bakery, a print shop, restaurants, banks, and other businesses, and plenty of orchards and vineyards.

The Queen Elizabeth Way, the main road that connects Toronto and Buffalo, New York, has an interchange at Beamsville. Many tourists stop off at the highway exit for something to eat at the many fast food restaurants located nearby.

Industry
Beamsville is in the heart of Ontario's wine country and contributes greatly to the wine industry in the Niagara Peninsula. Many wineries from the area have taken home top awards, including Grape King at the Niagara Grape & Wine Festival, as well as international awards.

Alanson Harris operated a foundry making farm tools and would go on to become farm implements marker Massey Harris.

History
Beamsville was named after Jacob Beam (1723-1812), a United Empire Loyalist. Both of his homes — the original one located on the Thirty Mile Creek, as well as the one near downtown Beamsville — are still intact today.

Jacob Beam (1723-1812) and wife Anna Catharine (Boughner) Beam (1737-1820), along with their daughter Catharine (Beam) Merrell (1766-1842), and son-in-law Samuel Russell Merrell (1757-1835), emigrated to Canada from Hopewell, Sussex County, New Jersey in 1788, and founded Beamsville.

By 1869, Beamsville was a village with a population of 550 in the Township of Clinton, Lincoln County. It was on the Great Western Railway. The average price of land in vicinity was $45.

In 1898, hockey players in the town of Beamsville were the first to make use of a hockey net.

In 1917 the Royal Flying Corps established a School of Aerial Fighting on the farmland immediately east of Beamsville. The school consisted of a camp, an airfield, and a gunnery range over Lake Ontario.  Today an historical plaque at 4222 Sann Road marks the geographical centre of the 300 acre school property.   The building adjacent to the plaque is an original hangar.

In 1970, the Town of Beamsville was amalgamated with Clinton Township and (half of) Louth Township to form the larger Town of Lincoln.

Education

There are five schools located in Beamsville: two secondary school (grades 9-12), and three elementary schools (Kindergarten-Grade 8).

District School Board of Niagara
Beamsville currently has one public secondary school, Beamsville District Secondary School.  Beamsville District Secondary School was first established in 1888 which is on Central Ave,  and draws students from all over the Town of Lincoln.  The current principal at BDSS is Mr. Miller and the current student population is just over 400 students.  BDSS currently ranks as the 451st-best secondary school in Ontario out of 740 according to the Fraser Institute

There are two public elementary schools located in Beamsville, Senator Gibson Public School and Jacob Beam Public School.

Niagara Catholic District School Board
The Niagara Catholic District School Board has two elementary schools in Beamsville (St. Johns and St. Mark). St. Mark Catholic Elementary School was opened in 2001. It has undergone a large expansion in 2011, growing to 22 classrooms. The current enrollment at St. Mark is 541 students. St. Johns Catholic Elementary School was built in 1958 and the current enrollment is 346 students

Private schools
Great Lakes Christian High School is a private, four year co-educational day and boarding Christian high school affiliated with the Churches of Christ.

People
The town is home to numerous Dutch and United Empire Loyalist families, as evidenced by the large number of Dutch Reformed and Anglican churches in the area. 

William Fairbrother, the inventor of the hockey net, lived in Beamsville. Bill Berg, formerly a hockey player for the Toronto Maple Leafs, and now an National Hockey League (NHL) broadcaster, was born, and continues to make his home in Beamsville. Paul Laus, a former Florida Panthers defenceman and Ryan Christie, who played seven games with the Dallas Stars and Calgary Flames are also Beamsville natives.

Another Beamsville native of note, Tonya Verbeek, earned an Olympic silver medal in women's wrestling at the 2004 Summer Olympics in Athens, Greece. She won a bronze medal at the 2008 Summer Olympics in Beijing, China, and another silver medal at the 2012 Summer Olympics in London, England.

Ralph Reid and Lloyd Southward, Beamsville natives, were Lancaster pilots during the Second World War and both were awarded the Distinguished Flying Cross (DFC).

Another Beamsville native is former Canadian Football League (CFL) running back, Andre Sadeghian. Andre was drafted in the third round of the 2007 CFL Draft by the B.C. Lions. He went on to play four seasons in the league with the aforementioned B.C. Lions, Hamilton Tiger-Cats, Saskatchewan Roughriders and Winnipeg Blue Bombers.

Evelyn Dick, known for the murder of her estranged husband, John Dick, was born and lived in this town.

Performance artist, writer, and former sex worker Nina Arsenault grew up in a trailer park in Beamsville.

References

External links

 Town of Lincoln website

Neighbourhoods in Lincoln, Ontario